Mannosyl-oligosaccharide 1,3-1,6-alpha-mannosidase (mannosidase II, exo-1,3-1,6-alpha-mannosidase, alpha-D-mannosidase II, alpha-mannosidase II, alpha1-3,6-mannosidase, GlcNAc transferase I-dependent alpha1,3[alpha1,6]mannosidase, Golgi alpha-mannosidase II, ManII, 1,3(1,6)-alpha-D-mannosidase, 1,3-(1,6-)mannosyl-oligosaccharide alpha-D-mannohydrolase) is an enzyme with systematic name (1->3)-(1->6)-mannosyl-oligosaccharide alpha-D-mannohydrolase. This enzyme catalyses the following chemical reaction

 Hydrolysis of the terminal (1->3)- and (1->6)-linked alpha-D-mannose residues in the mannosyl-oligosaccharide Man5(GlcNAc)3

This enzyme is involved in the synthesis of glycoproteins. It is a key enzyme of N-linked Glycan processing and is inhibited by small molecule swainsonine.

References

External links 
 

EC 3.2.1